Clement Rigg (7 February 1899 – 1966) was an English professional footballer who played as a full back. He played over 250 matches in the Football League for Nelson.

References

People from Todmorden
English footballers
Association football fullbacks
Portsmouth Rovers F.C. players
Nelson F.C. players
Burnley F.C. players
Newcastle United F.C. players
English Football League players
1899 births
1966 deaths
Sportspeople from Yorkshire